Ramón Escobar may refer to:
 Ramón Escobar (footballer), Paraguayan footballer
 Ramón Escobar Santiago, Spanish politician
 Ramon Escobar (serial killer), Salvadoran serial killer